Argyresthia bonnetella is a moth of the family Yponomeutidae. It is found in Europe. The wingspan is 9–11 mm. The head is white. Forewings are shining ochreous-whitish, usually strigulated and sometimes discally suffused with ferruginous brown; a suffused ferruginous -brown median longitudinal streak from base to before middle; a curved dark ferruginous- brown fascia from middle of dorsum to 4/5 of costa, sometimes obsolete except on dorsum. Hindwings are grey. The larva is yellow-green; head and plate of 2 brown. 

The moth flies from July to September. . 

The larvae feed on Crataegus.

References

Notes
The flight season refers to Belgium and The Netherlands. This may vary in other parts of the range.

External links
 waarneming.nl 
 Argyresthia bonnetella at UK Moths

Argyresthia
Moths described in 1758
Taxa named by Carl Linnaeus
Moths of Europe